Fred Lonberg-Holm (born 1 October 1962) is an American cellist based in Chicago. He moved from New York City to Chicago in 1995.

Lonberg-Holm is most identified with playing free improvisation and free jazz. He is also a composer of concert works.  As a session musician and arranger, he is credited on rock, pop, and country records.

As leader 
Lonberg-Holm has led Valentine Trio, with Jason Roebke (bass) and Frank Rosaly (drums). This jazz trio performs original compositions as well as tunes by both jazz composers (e.g. Sun Ra) and pop songwriters (e.g. Jeff Tweedy, Syd Barrett). The group released its first album, Terminal Valentine, in 2007, which was reviewed by AllAboutJazz critic Nils Jacobson.

He has directed performances of his Lightbox Orchestra, an improvising ensemble with a flexible, ever-changing membership. Lonberg-Holm does not play an instrument in this group but rather conducts its non-idiomatic improvisations via the "lightbox" and by holding up handwritten signs. The lightbox contains a light bulb for each musician which Lonberg-Holm switches on or off to suggest when they should play.

Other groups 

Lonberg-Holm was a member of Terminal 4, which released an album in 2003 called When I'm Falling that received four and a half stars by Allmusic, The Boxhead' Ensemble, Pillow, the Lonberg-Holm/Kessler/Zerang trio (with Kent Kessler and Michael Zerang), and the Dörner/Lonberg-Holm duo (with Axel Dörner). He has been a member of the Vandermark 5 and Vandermark's Territory Band, the Joe McPhee Trio, the Peter Brötzmann Chicago Tentet, and Keefe Jackson's Fast Citizens.

When he lived in New York, Lonberg-Holm collaborated with the rock group God Is My Co-Pilot pianist and composer Anthony Coleman as well as multi-instrumentalist Paul Duncan of Warm Ghost.  In Chicago, he worked with Jim O'Rourke, Bobby Conn,  The Flying Luttenbachers, Lake of Dracula, Wilco, Rivulets, Mats Gustafsson, Sten Sandell, Jaap Blonk, and John Butcher.

As composer 
Lonberg-Holm's concert works have been premiered by William Winant, Carrie Biolo, the Austin New Music Co-Op,  Subtropics Ensemble, Duo Atypica, the Schanzer/ Duo, New Winds, Paul Hoskin, Kevin Norton, the E.S.P. Ensemble, and others.

His scores for dance have been performed at the Brooklyn Academy of Music and Dance Theater Workshop as well as many other venues.

He is a former composition student of Anthony Braxton and Morton Feldman.

He performed improvised music in the role of a troubled composer who finds inspiration in the love of a couple he spots on the street in a short film for the Playboy channel.

Discography
 Theory of Motion 1990 (Curious/Pogus)
 Solos and Trios 1991 (Curious/Collision)
 Personal Scratch 1996 (EDM)
 Joy of Being 1997 (Knitting Factory)
 Building a Better Future 1998 (Miguel)
 Terminal 4 2001 (Atavistic)
 A Valentine for Fred Katz 2002 (Atavistic)
 When I'm Falling 2003 (Truck Stop)
 Dialogs 2004 (Emanem) Reviewed by AllAboutJazz
 Other Valentines 2005 (Atavistic)
 Terminal Valentine 2007 (Atavistic)
 VCDC 2011 (Hispid)
 Gather 2012 (Delmark)

With Anthony Coleman
 Selfhaters (Tzadik, 1996)
 The Abysmal Richness of the Infinite Proximity of the Same (Tzadik, 1998)

With Paul Rutherford
 Chicago 2002 (Emanem, 2002)

With Stirrup
 Sewn (482 Music, 2013)
 A Man Can't Ride on One (Whistler, 2015)

References

External links
 Official website
 AllMusic biography and discography
 interview (Perfect Sound Forever)
 interview (Fake Jazz)
 interview (Ink 19)
 interview (Dead CEO)

Living people
1962 births
American jazz cellists
American male jazz musicians
Boxhead Ensemble members
CIMP artists
The Flying Luttenbachers members
Locust Music artists
Emanem Records artists